The year 2007 in architecture involved some significant architectural events and new buildings.

Events
May 30 – The Saitta House at Dyker Heights, Brooklyn, New York built in 1899 is added to the National Register of Historic Places.
June 26 – The Museum of the History of Polish Jews groundbreaking  ceremony is held in Warsaw. The building is completed in 2013.
July 21 – Construction of Burj Khalifa surpasses the height of Taipei 101 (510 m) to become the tallest building in the world at 818m.

Buildings and structures

Buildings opened
January 20 – Olympic Sculpture Park, Seattle, WA., USA, designed by Weiss/Manfredi.
January 21 – The National Art Center, Tokyo, designed by Kisho Kurokawa.
February 28 – San Francisco Federal Building, by Morphosis.
March 8 – Limoges Concert Hall, France, by Bernard Tschumi Architects.
March 9 – New Wembley Stadium, London (original stadium demolished in 2002).
March 23 – Pakistan Monument, Islamabad, designed by Arif Masoud.
April 25 – IAC/InterActiveCorp headquarters opens in New York, by Gehry Partners.
May 27 – St Bede's Church, Basingstoke, England (Roman Catholic), designed by Maguire and Murray.
June 2 – Michael Lee-Chin Crystal at Royal Ontario Museum, Toronto, designed by Daniel Libeskind.
June 9 – Bloch Building, Nelson-Atkins Museum of Art addition, Kansas City, Mo. by Steven Holl Architects.
June – Pawilon Wyspiański 2000, Kraków, Poland, by Krzysztof Ingarden.
June–July – East Beach Cafe, Littlehampton, England, by Thomas Heatherwick.
 August – La Vicaria Arch Bridge in Spain.
August 9 – Roland Levinsky Building at the University of Plymouth, Devon, England, by Henning Larsen.
September 16 – Hull Paragon Interchange (railway station reconstruction), Kingston upon Hull, England, designed by WilkinsonEyre.
October – Museum of Contemporary Art Denver, by David Adjaye.
October 12 – Armed Forces Memorial, National Memorial Arboretum, Staffordshire, England, by Liam O'Connor Architects and Planning Consultants.
October 17 – BMW Welt ("BMW World") exhibition facility in Munich, Germany, by Coop Himmelb(l)au.
November 3 – Digital Beijing Building in China, by Pei Zhu.
December 1 – The New Museum of Contemporary Art, New York, by SANAA.
December 10 – Inauguration of Gare de Marseille-Saint-Charles' major reconstruction as a transportation interchange in France.

Buildings completed

Manchester Civil Justice Centre by Denton Corker Marshall.
Beetham Tower, Manchester by Ian Simpson.
Calgary Courts Centre in Calgary, Alberta
Kolumba (diocesan art museum) in Cologne, Germany, designed by Peter Zumthor.
Tama Art University Library, Hachiōji campus in Tokyo, designed by Toyo Ito.
Wachendorf-Feldkapelle-Bruder-Klaus, Germany, designed by Peter Zumthor.
FiftyTwoDegrees in Nijmegen, designed by Mecanoo.
Fontana Boathouse, West Side Rowing Club, Buffalo, New York, based on a 1905 plan by Frank Lloyd Wright.
The Lighthouse, Watford, Britain's first zero-carbon house, designed by Sheppard Robson.
Albury Library Museum, designed by Ashton Raggatt McDougall in Albury, New South Wales, Australia.

Exhibitions
 Arch Moscow

Awards
 AIA Gold Medal – Edward Larrabee Barnes
 Architecture Firm Award – Leers Weinzapfel Associates Architects
 BNA Building of the Year (nl) - Vesteda Tower
 Driehaus Architecture Prize – Jaquelin T. Robertson
 Emporis Skyscraper Award – Het Strijkijzer
 European Union Prize for Contemporary Architecture (Mies van der Rohe Prize) – Mansilla+Tuñón Arquitectos for Contemporary Art Museum of Castilla y León
 Grand Prix de l'urbanisme – Yves Lion
 Mies van der Rohe Prize – Mansilla+Tuñón Arquitectos for the MUSAC in León, Spain
Praemium Imperiale Architecture Award – Herzog & de Meuron
 Pritzker Prize – Richard Rogers
 RAIA Gold Medal – Enrico Taglietti
 RIBA Royal Gold Medal – Herzog & de Meuron
 Stirling Prize – David Chipperfield Architects for the Museum of Modern Literature in Marbach am Neckar
Thomas Jefferson Medal in Architecture – Zaha Hadid
 Twenty-five Year Award – Vietnam Veterans Memorial
 Vincent Scully Prize – Witold Rybczynski

Deaths
May 14 – Sir Colin St John Wilson, English architect (born 1922)
June 26 – Lucien Hervé, French architectural photographer (born 1910)
June 20 – Margaret Helfand, American architect and urban planner based in Manhattan (born 1947; colon cancer)
August 11 – Wolf Hilbertz, German-born futurist architect, inventor and marine scientist (born 1938)
September 30 – Oswald Mathias Ungers, German rationalist architect and architectural theorist (born 1926)
October 12 – Kisho Noriaki Kurokawa, Japanese architect and co-founder of the Metabolist Movement (born 1934)
October 21 – Jorge Arango, Colombian-born American minimalist architect (born 1917)

See also
Timeline of architecture

References

 
21st-century architecture